Pleuronectinae is a subfamily of fish in the family Pleuronectidae, comprising 27 genera and 62 extant species (there are also fossil species, including two Clidoderma). Members of the subfamily are demersal carnivores that live in arctic and northern seas.

Taxonomy

Tribes:
 Isopsettini – monotypic: Isopsetta isolepis
 Microstomini – 22 species in 8 genera
 Pleuronectini – 20 species in 7 genera 
 Psettichthyini – monotypic: Psettichthys melanostictus

Unplaced genera (18 extant species in 10 genera):
 Acanthopsetta
 Atheresthes
 Cleisthenes
 Clidoderma
 Eopsetta
 Hippoglossoides
 Hippoglossus
 Lyopsetta
 Reinhardtius
 Verasper

References

Pleuronectidae
Fish subfamilies
Taxa named by Georges Cuvier